Slow Dazzle is the fifth solo studio album by Welsh musician John Cale, released on 25 March 1975, his second album for record label Island.

Content
"Mr. Wilson" is about seminal American musician Brian Wilson; the Beach Boys founding member has been a strong influence on Cale's work over the years. The song reflects the strong, divisive personal struggles in Wilson's life. The music's tone fluctuates from paranoid and unhappy to warm and pleasant moment by moment.

"Heartbreak Hotel" is a cover of the Elvis Presley song (written by Mae Boren Axton and Tommy Durden) with fundamental elements of the track changed such the singing taking in "chilling" screams and dark synthesizer elements added to the background.

The track "Guts" opens with the line "The bugger in the short sleeves fucked my wife". This refers to rock musician Kevin Ayers sleeping with Cale's wife before the concert that's captured on the June 1, 1974 album; John Cale related the details in his autobiography, with Victor Bockris, What's Welsh for Zen, that was published in 1998.

"The Jeweler" is a spoken word piece under an instrumental backdrop that recalls, at least in its poetic and freeform structure, the track "The Gift" from the Velvet Underground's second album White Light/White Heat. While Cale speaks in a calm, monotone voice, "The Jeweller" features a drone-like set of unsettling sounds that appear to build and build without reaching a conclusion.

Track 2, "Taking It All Away", was misprinted on all Island Record CD releases of the album as "Talking It All Away".

The cover photography was by Keith Morris. It is also the second consecutive album to feature both Brian Eno and Phil Manzanera of Roxy Music.

Release
Slow Dazzle was released on 25 March 1975. No singles were released off the album, although there was a promotional-only single of "Dirty-Ass Rock 'n' Roll" b/w "Heartbreak Hotel".

The album was remastered in 1996 as part of the 2CD release The Island Years, containing also both Fear (1974) and Helen of Troy (1975). It contained two bonus tracks; also, the last track "The Jeweller" was shortened to 4:11.

There was a month-long tour around the UK and Europe promoting the album. The musicians were Cale, Chris Spedding on guitar, Pat Donaldson on bass, Timi Donald on drums and Chris Thomas on keyboards. When the tour finished, Spedding joined the Roy Harper's backing band Trigger, consisting of Dave Cochran on bass and Bill Bruford on drums.

Critical reception

Trouser Press described the album as "more restrained, but no less entrancing than Fear". Cale's cover of "Heartbreak Hotel" has been cited by music critic Ned Raggett as one of the best cover songs ever recorded.

Track listing
All tracks composed by John Cale, except where indicated.

Side A
"Mr. Wilson" – 3:17
"Taking It All Away" – 2:59
"Dirty-Ass Rock 'n' Roll" – 4:44
"Darling I Need You" – 3:38
"Rollaroll" – 3:59

Side B
"Heartbreak Hotel" (Mae Boren Axton, Tommy Durden, Elvis Presley) – 3:14
"Ski Patrol" – 2:12
"I'm Not the Loving Kind" – 3:12
"Guts" – 3:27
"The Jeweller" – 5:07

Bonus tracks 1996 remaster
"All I Want Is You" – 2:55
 "Bamboo Floor" – 3:24

Personnel
Credits are adapted from the Slow Dazzle liner notes.

Musicians
 John Cale – vocals; piano; organ; clavinet
 Gerry Conway – drums
 Pat Donaldson – bass
 Timi Donald – drums
 Brian Eno – synthesizer
 Phil Manzanera – guitar
 Geoff Muldaur – harmony vocals on "Guts" and "Darling I Need You"
 Chris Spedding – guitar
 Chris Thomas – violin; electric piano
 Tony Burrows, Russell Stone, Neil Lancaster – harmony vocals on "Mr. Wilson"
 Steve Gregory – saxophone on "Darling I Need You"

Production and artwork
 John Cale – producer; cover
 John Wood – executive producer
 A. Secunda – executive producer on "Heartbreak Hotel"
 Vic Gamm – engineer
 John Wood – engineer
 Michael Wade – design
 Keith Morris – photography

References

External links
 

1975 albums
John Cale albums
Albums produced by John Cale
Island Records albums